Woody Shaw: The Complete Columbia Albums Collection is a 6-CD box set compilation of recordings by jazz trumpeter, composer and bandleader Woody Shaw, released in 2011.

The box set includes Shaw's original five Columbia albums plus a CD of previously-unreleased recordings taken from the original master tapes of Shaw's Stepping Stones: Live at the Village Vanguard session.

CD and Track Listing

References

2011 compilation albums
Woody Shaw compilation albums
Columbia Records compilation albums
Legacy Recordings compilation albums
Albums produced by Michael Cuscuna